The physician to the president is the formal and official title of the physician who is chosen by the president to be his personal physician. 
Often, the physician to the president also serves as the director of the White House Medical Unit, a unit of the White House Military Office responsible for the medical needs of the president of the United States, vice president, White House staff, and visitors. The physician to the president is also the chief White House physician.

History

Doctors who have treated the president of the United States have had a variety of titles. Presley Marion Rixey, a medical inspector in the United States Navy, was the first individual to serve in a full-time capacity as physician to the president beginning in 1901, although the title "White House Physician" was not used until created by an act of Congress in 1928. It has been unclear if this legal position of White House physician rests with the physician to the president or the director of the White House Medical Unit.

Organization and role
The White House physician has an office inside the White House. The location of their medical unit plays an important role in keeping the president of the United States healthy. They also oversee a staff which is typically composed of five military physicians, five physician assistants, five nurses, three paramedics, three administrators and one IT manager. The physician to the president is metaphorically the "shadow of the president" because they (or one of the physicians assigned to the White House Medical Unit) are always close at hand whether the president is at the White House, overseas, on the campaign trail, or aboard presidential plane Air Force One; Daniel Ruge, for example, was nearby during the attempted assassination of Ronald Reagan in 1981, and supervised the president's immediate treatment.

The physician to the president protects the president's health. The physician to the president, together with the director of the White House Medical Unit, is also responsible for managing comprehensive medical care for the members of the president's immediate family, the vice president, and the vice president's family and providing the medical support to ensure the continuity of the presidency. The physician may also provide medical care and attention to the more than 1.5 million visitors who tour the White House each year, as well as to international dignitaries and other guests of the president.

The medical office of the White House doctor is a "mini urgent-care center" containing a physician's office, private examination rooms, basic medications and medical supplies, and a crash cart for emergency resuscitation. Air Force One is equipped with emergency medical equipment, an operating table, and operating room lights installed at the center of the presidential plane for emergency use by the White House doctor. 

Ruge resigned after Reagan's first term and called his job "vastly overrated, boring and not medically challenging". Ruge could not attend most state dinners due to lack of space. He nonetheless had to be ready for emergencies, and usually waited alone in his office wearing a tuxedo. Ruge stated that an advantage, however, was that because of the position's prestige "[a] president's physician can ask for anything, and he will get it. No doctor will refuse a request to consult". The White House physician can enter the Oval Office or Executive Residence at any time; Ruge sometimes invited experts visiting Washington to examine the president.

Selection of the physician
The White House physician is often selected personally by the president, and most White House doctors are active-duty military officers, in part because most civilians would find closing and then later reopening their private practices difficult. Ruge was about to retire when Reagan chose him as his physician.

, Colonel Kevin O'Connor, DO, USA (Ret.) is the incumbent White House physician.

White House physicians
Some of the individuals who have acted as physicians to the president: 
 1789: Samuel Bard, MD. Bard was the first physician known to have treated a president when he lanced a boil on George Washington's thigh.
 1789 to 1797: James Craig. Craig was a family friend of George Washington's.
 1895: Leonard Wood, MD, USA. Wood was not only the White House physician to President Grover Cleveland in 1895, but also the personal physician of President and Mrs. William McKinley.
 1913 to 1921: RADM Cary Travers Grayson, MD, Pharm.D., USN.
 1921 to 1923: Charles E. Sawyer, HMD
 1923 to 1929: Major James Francis Coupal, MD, MS, US Army
 1929 to 1933: Commander Joel Thompson Boone, MD, US Navy
 1933 to 1945: VADM Ross T. McIntire, MD, US Navy
 1945: Lieutenant Commander Howard G. Bruenn, MD, US Navy 
 1945 to 1953: Major General Wallace H. Graham, MD, US Army
 1953 to 1961: Major General Howard McCrum Snyder, MD
 1961 to 1963: Janet G. Travell, MD
 1963 to 1969: RADM George G. Burkley, MD, US Navy (concurrent from 1963 to 1966 with Capt. James Young, MD, USN
 1969 to 1974: Major General Walter R. Tkach, MD, USAF
 1974 to 1981: RADM William M. Lukash, MD, FACP, FACG, USN
 1981 to 1985: Daniel Ruge, MD, Ph.D.
 1985 to 1986: T. Burton Smith, MD
 1986 to 1987: John E. Hutton, Jr., MD
 1987 to 1993: Colonel Lawrence C. Mohr, Jr., MD, FACP, FCCP, US (concurrent from 1989 to 1993 with Burton J. Lee III)
 1989 to 1993: Burton J. Lee III, MD (concurrent with Lawrence C. Mohr, Jr.)
 1993 to 2001: RDML Eleanor Mariano, MD, US Navy
 2002 to 2009: Brigadier General Richard J. Tubb, MD, USAF
 2009 to 2013: Captain Jeffrey Kuhlman, MD, USN
 2013 to 2018: RDML Ronny Jackson, MD, USN
 March 2018 to January 2021: CDR Sean Conley, DO, USN.
 From January 2021: Colonel Kevin O'Connor, DO, USA (Ret.)

Footnotes

Notes

References

Bibliography
 Deppisch, Ludwig M. The White House Physician: A History From Washington to George W. Bush. Jefferson, NC: McFarland, 2007. 
 Evans, Hugh E. The Hidden Campaign: FDR's Health and the 1944 Election. Armonk, NY: Sharpe, 2002. 
 Ferrell, Robert H. The Dying President: Franklin D. Roosevelt, 1944-1945. Columbia, MO: University of Missouri Press, 1998.
 Ferrell, Robert H. Ill-Advised: Presidential Health and Public Trust. Columbia, MO: University of Missouri Press, 1992.
 Joynt, Robert J. and Toole, James F. Presidential Disability: Papers and Discussions on Inability and Disability Among U.S. Presidents. Woodbridge, Suffolk, UK: University of Rochester Press, 2001.
 Levin, Phyllis Lee. Edith and Woodrow: The Wilson White House. New York: Simon and Schuster, 2001. 
 McCullough, David. Truman. New York: Simon and Schuster, 2003.
 Smith, Jean Edward. Eisenhower: In War and Peace. New York: Random House, 2012. 
 Steely, Skipper. Pearl Harbor Countdown: Admiral James O. Richardson. Gretna, LA: Pelican Publishing, 2008. 
 Ullman, Dana. The Homeopathic Revolution: Why Famous People and Cultural Heroes Choose Homeopathy. Berkeley, CA: North Atlantic Books, 2007. 

+
American military personnel